State Road 217 (NM 217) is a state highway in the US state of New Mexico. NM 217's southern terminus is in the village of Yrisarri, at NM 337 and NM 217's northern terminus is at NM 333 east of Sedillo.

Major intersections

See also

References

217
Transportation in Bernalillo County, New Mexico